This is a list of years in Belgium. See also the timeline of Belgian history.  For only articles about years in Belgium that have been written, see :Category:Years in Belgium.

Twenty-first century

Twentieth century

Nineteenth century

Eighteenth century

Seventeenth century

Sixteenth century

See also 
 Timeline of Belgian history
 List of years by country

 
Belgium history-related lists
Belgium